Chlodwig, Landgrave of Hesse-Philippsthal-Barchfeld (Chlodwig Alexis Ernst; 30 July 1876 – 17 November 1954) was an officer in the Prussian Army and head of the Hesse-Philippsthal line of the House of Hesse.

As head of the house he was styled His Highness the Landgrave of Hesse-Philippsthal-Barchfeld.

Early life
Landgrave Chlodwig, the seventh of ten children of Prince William of Hesse-Philippsthal-Barchfeld, was born at Burgsteinfurt. He was the only surviving son from his father's second marriage with Princess Juliane of Bentheim and Steinfurt; his only surviving full sibling, Princess Bertha, was married to Leopold IV, Prince of Lippe.

Although the third son Landgrave Chlodwig became heir to the headship of the House of Hesse-Philippsthal-Barchfeld upon the death of his uncle in 1905 due to his elder half brothers Prince Friedrich Wilhelm and Prince Carl Wilhelm von Ardeck's exclusion from the succession on account of their parents morganatic marriage.

Landgrave Chlodwig served in the Prussian Army reaching the rank of lieutenant colonel. On 26 May 1904 he married Princess Caroline of Solms-Hohensolms-Lich, the daughter of Prince Hermann, in her home town of Lich. The couple had five children: Wilhelm Ernst Alexis Hermann (1905-1942) who married Princess Marianne of Prussia, Ernst Ludwig (1906-1934), Irene (1907-1980), Alexander Friedrich (1911-1939) and Viktoria Cäcilie (1914-1998).

Landgrave
On 16 August 1905, Chlodwig succeeded his uncle Landgrave Alexis as head of the House of Hesse-Philippsthal-Barchfeld, giving him a seat in the House of Lords of Prussia. On 22 December 1925 he inherited the assets and headship of the House of 
Hesse-Philippsthal following the death of Landgrave Ernst.

In the early 1930s three of Landgrave Chlodwig's children (Wilhelm, Alexander Friedrich and Viktoria Cäcilie) joined the Nazi party. His third son Prince Alexander Friedrich, who suffered from epilepsy, was sterilised by the Nazis on 27 September 1938, he died a year later. The landgrave's eldest son Prince Wilhelm, an SS-Hauptsturmführer, was killed in action during World War II.

Landgrave Chlodwig died aged 78 in Bad Hersfeld, he was survived by his wife and daughters, his three sons having predeceased him. His grandson Wilhelm succeeded him as head of the House of Hesse-Philippsthal.

Honours
Knight of the House Order of the Golden Lion of Hesse, 21 December 1898
Grand Cross of the Order of Ludwig of Hesse, 14 May 1910
Grand Cross of the Princely House Order of Lippe
Grand Cross of the Order of the Red Eagle of Prussia
Knight of the Order of St. John of Prussia
Grand Cross of the Ducal Saxe-Ernestine House Order
Grand Cross of the Princely House Order of Schaumburg-Lippe
Cross of Merit of Waldeck and Pyrmont

Ancestry

References

|-

|-

1876 births
1954 deaths
People from Steinfurt
Landgraves of Hesse
House of Hesse